Sərkar or Sarkyar may refer to:
 Sərkar, Goygol, Azerbaijan
 Sərkar, Samukh, Azerbaijan